Dorset County Council (DCC) was the county council for the county of Dorset in England. It provided the upper tier of local government, below which were district councils, and town and parish councils. The county council had 46 elected councillors and was based at County Hall in Dorchester. The council was abolished on 31 March 2019 as part of structural changes to local government in Dorset.

Responsibilities for services

Dorset County Council's responsibilities included schools, social care for the elderly and vulnerable, road maintenance, libraries and trading standards.

The county council's area was also administered by six smaller authorities that have their own district or borough councils. The responsibilities of these councils included local planning, council housing, refuse collection, sports and leisure facilities, and street cleaning. The district areas are further divided into civil parishes, which have "parish councils" or "town councils"; the latter of which often use a town hall. Typical activities undertaken by a parish council included maintaining allotments, footpaths, playing fields and the local community or village hall. On some matters, the county council shared responsibilities with the district and parish councils. These included economic development and regeneration, emergency planning, tourism promotion and coastal protection.

Dorset Waste Partnership

In 2011 Dorset County Council became "host authority" for the newly-formed Dorset Waste Partnership, whereby, in theory, the six borough and district councils within Dorset worked together to collect and dispose of the county's waste. As host authority, Dorset County Council employed the waste partnership's staff and provided support facilities, such as IT, customer services and procurement. A new system of kerbside collections was rolled out across the county in five stages, beginning with Christchurch in October 2012.

The new service attracted criticism from the start and came under particularly heavy censure from October 2014, when it was rolled out across Weymouth and Portland: by the end of the month the Council was receiving 1,100 calls a day relating to the new service, while a "spokesman" admitted that 300 bins had still not been delivered to Weymouth and Portland's residents. Bags of waste meanwhile mounted up on Weymouth's streets: the partnership refused to collect them on the grounds that the waste was not in authorised "blue sacks", but residents claimed that they had never been issued with these sacks in the first place. Complaints, mainly involving missed collections, continued into 2015 and 2016.

In February 2015 it was revealed that the partnership was £2.76 million over budget, and Steve Burdis, director of the Dorset Waste Partnership, was suspended from his post as three separate investigations into the overspend got underway. A report by Dorset County Council's monitoring officer found that unlawful activity had contributed to the overspend, including the awarding of two vehicle hire contracts worth £765,000 and £808,000 without following compliant tendering processes:indeed, in the case of the £765,000 contract, "it seems that no tendering process was followed at all". In addition, a three-year consultancy contract worth £270,000 "also amounted to an unlawful direct award". Steve Burdis was dismissed in March 2016. As for the Dorset Waste Partnership, it effectively ceased to exist in April 2019 with the dissolution of Dorset County Council and the various borough and district councils; waste became the responsibility of the two new unitary authorities in Dorset, Bournemouth, Christchurch and Poole Council and Dorset Council, with most of the partnership's staff and assets being transferred to the latter.

2015-19 local government reorganisation

In September 2015, the Dorset Echo reported plans to merge the borough and district councils of Poole, Bournemouth, East Dorset and Christchurch, creating one breakaway "super-council" across the south-eastern part of the county. A meeting of leaders and chief executives of all nine of Dorset's local authorities followed on 12 October 2015, "to discuss options for the future of local government in the area". That was followed by a series of public consultations and, ultimately, by statutory instruments for the reform of local government across Dorset, drawn up in May 2018. Under these proposals, dubbed "Future Dorset", all existing councils within the county would be abolished and replaced by two new unitary authorities. The first would be formed from the existing unitary authorities of Bournemouth and Poole which merged with the non-metropolitan district of Christchurch to create a unitary authority to be known as Bournemouth, Christchurch and Poole Council. The other was created from the merger of the existing non-metropolitan districts of Weymouth and Portland, West Dorset, North Dorset, Purbeck and East Dorset and was to be known as Dorset Council. The two new authorities came into being on 1 April 2019.

See also
 List of articles about local government in the United Kingdom
2017 United Kingdom local elections
Dorset County Council elections for historic elections to the council.

References

External links
Dorset for You 
Shadow Dorset Council 

County Council
Former county councils of England
1889 establishments in England
Local authorities in Dorset
Major precepting authorities in England
Leader and cabinet executives
2019 disestablishments in England